Kenneth Ploen [PLAYN],  (born June 3, 1935) is a former star quarterback in American college football and for the Winnipeg Blue Bombers of the Canadian Football League (CFL).

College football

In 1956, Ploen became the University of Iowa Hawkeyes starting quarterback. That year, he led his team to its first Big Ten Conference title in 35 years and a victory in the 1957 Rose Bowl Game. He was named an All-American and the Big Ten player of the year.  He was voted the 1957 Rose Bowl's Most Valuable Player.

Canadian Football League
Ploen was selected by the Cleveland Browns in the 19th round of the 1957 NFL Draft  On June 10, 1957 it was announced that Ploen had signed a contract with the Winnipeg Blue Bombers in the Canadian Football League rather than report to the Browns.   

Ploen played quarterback for the Winnipeg from 1957 to 1967. He also filled in at halfback and safety. Ploen led his team to six Grey Cup appearances (1957, 1958, 1959, 1961, 1962, 1965), including four victories: 1958, 1959, 1961, 1962 and two losses: 1957, 1965. In the 49th Grey Cup game (1961), he scored one of the most memorable touchdowns in professional football history, eluding numerous defenders on an eighteen-yard run into the endzone during overtime to win it (see video below).  He was voted the 1961 Grey Cup Most Valuable Player, was selected as a divisional All-Star three times.

Kenny Ploen was inducted into the Canadian Football Hall of Fame in 1975, the Manitoba Sports Hall of Fame and Museum in 1987, the Rose Bowl Hall of Fame in 1997, and the Iowa Sports Hall of Fame in 2002.  In 2005, Ploen was named one of the Blue Bombers 20 All-Time Greats.

After football
After Ploen retired from football, he and his wife made Winnipeg their home. He worked as a sales representative and as a colour commentator for a local radio station.

In 2007, he was awarded the Order of Manitoba.

In September 2009, he was recognized by fan vote and the Canadian Football Hall of Fame, as the Most Outstanding CFL Player of the 1960s.

In June 2011, the CFL announced the west entry service road off Chancellor Matheson Road next to the new Winnipeg Blue Bombers stadium will be named Ken Ploen Way, to honor the former Blue Bombers quarterback and Canadian Football Hall of Famer. Ploen was also honored at half-time, during the Blue Bombers’ first 2011 home preseason game, where the street sign was unveiled.

In 2012 in honour of the 100th Grey Cup, Canada Post used his image on a series of commemorative postage stamps. The image was also used on presentation posters and other materials to promote the Grey Cup game and other celebrations associated with the centennial.

Kenny Ploen is also the distant cousin to Tim Ploen, of Dexter, Iowa.

Video clips

References

1935 births
Living people
American emigrants to Canada
American football quarterbacks
American players of Canadian football
Canadian Football Hall of Fame inductees
Canadian Football League announcers
Canadian football quarterbacks
Iowa Hawkeyes football players
Members of the Order of Manitoba
People from Lost Nation, Iowa
Players of American football from Iowa
Sports commentators
Winnipeg Blue Bombers players